The 2018 Southern Illinois Salukis football team represented Southern Illinois University Carbondale as a member of the Missouri Valley Football Conference (MVFC) during the 2018 NCAA Division I FCS football season. Led by third-year head coach Nick Hill, the Salukis compiled an overall record of 2–9 with a mark of 1–7 in conference play, placing last out of ten teams in the MVFC. Southern Illinois played home games at Saluki Stadium in Carbondale, Illinois.

Preseason

Preseason MVFC poll
The MVFC released their preseason poll on July 29, 2018, with the Redbirds predicted to finish in eighth place.

Preseason All-MVFC Teams
The Salukis placed four players on the preseason all-MVFC teams.

Offense

1st team

Darrell James – WR

Defense

1st team

Jeremy Chinn – DB

Lane Reazin – P

2nd team

Anthony Knighton – DL

Schedule

Game summaries

at Murray State

at Ole Miss

Southeast Missouri State

South Dakota

at Youngstown State

at Illinois State

Indiana State

at Missouri State

Western Illinois

South Dakota State

at North Dakota State

References

Southern Illinois
Southern Illinois Salukis football seasons
Southern Illinois Salukis football